Nineteeneighties is a cover album by American singer-songwriter Grant-Lee Phillips. It was released on June 27, 2006 under Zoë Records.

Critical reception
Nineteeneighties was met with "generally favorable" reviews from critics. At Metacritic, which assigns a weighted average rating out of 100 to reviews from mainstream publications, this release received an average score of 75, based on 10 reviews. Aggregator Album of the Year gave the release a 73 out of 100 based on a critical consensus of 5 reviews.

Track listing

References

External links
 Musicomh.com review of Nineteeneighties
 Being There review of Nineteeneighties

Grant-Lee Phillips albums
2006 albums
Covers albums
Zoë Records albums